Chuckanut Bay is a crescent-shaped bay about  long in southwestern Whatcom County, directly south of Bellingham, Washington, United States. The bay was formed along the axis of a plunging syncline during the formation of the Chuckanut Mountains . It is situated on the east shore of the Salish Sea at the southeast end of Bellingham Bay. The bay was named Puerto del Socorro by Lieut. Juan Francisco de Eliza in 1791. The present name was chosen by Capt. Henry Roeder on December 1, 1852. The name 'Chuckanut' is derived from a native word for "Long beach far from a narrow entrance" Prominent natural features include Pleasant Bay located south of Chuckanut Bay, Mud Bay to the north and Chuckanut Island (aka Dot Island) and Chuckanut Rocks to the west. Other natural features include Teddy Bear Cove, Governors Point and Clark Point. The most prominent creeks that drain into the bay are Chuckanut Creek and Fragrance Lake Outlet. The bay is home to interesting tafoni formations found in the area.

Communities

Chuckanut Village, located near Mud Bay along the north shore of Chuckanut Creek, is the southernmost neighborhood in Bellingham. The Chuckanut Bay Community is further south of Chuckanut Village and had a population of 60 people in the 1940s. It was centered around a ferry landing for the San Juan Islands and Sydney, BC from 1935 to 1941. After the ferry closed, the landing became the foundation for the Chuckanut Bay Yacht Club. When the yacht club closed in 1946, the clubhouse was moved to LaConner WA and is now a waterfront restaurant there.

The Chuckanut Bay Community Association (CBCA) currently has a membership of over 400 households. The CBCA is a non-profit organization committed to foster a spirit of community among residents in the Chuckanut Bay and Chuckanut Mountain area. The CBCA was initially formed in 1992 to support volunteer firefighters in their district, and continues today as a non-profit organization dedicated to serving the Chuckanut community.  The communities are linked to Bellingham and Burlington by State Route 11, also known as Chuckanut Drive.

Chuckanut Beaches Association (CBA) is a community association that shares five beaches among their membership. CBA was originally incorporated in 1954 as Chuckanut Beaches Inc. and was reincorporated in 1994 as Chuckanut Beaches Association. The five Chuckanut beaches were deeded from the Charles F. Larrabee estate (Larrabee State Park donor) to Chuckanut Beaches, Inc. in 1954. The quit-claim deed states: "Said land is hereby conveyed for park, boat haven, beach and playground purposes, or for one or more of the aforesaid purposes, but may be held in an undeveloped state by grantee, its successors or assigns".

Selected History

  The Chuckanut Stone Quarry was opened in 1880 and closed in 1908.
  A salmon cannery opened in 1900, went bankrupt two years later, and became Astoria-Puget Sound Cannery. The cannery was moved to Excursion Outlet, Alaska after fish traps were outlawed in 1934. Old buildings were used as warehouses until 1948.
  Chuckanut Mountain was logged in the 1890s and the bay was used to raft logs and to load ships.
  Three and four masted sailing ships were built in the bay in the early 1900s.
  A brick and tile plant was opened in 1915 and ran for several years before it shut down. 
  Moonshiners and rum runners used the bay during prohibition.
  Coal was mined and stone quarried on the west side of Governors Point in 1921.
  Pleasant Bay was used to overwinter moored sailing ships in 1902.
  A chicken ranch was operated from 1936 to 1964
– Source:

References

Bays of Washington (state)
Geography of Washington (state)
Washington placenames of Native American origin